The Mohn Basin is a major depression in the surface near the edge of the Antarctic polar plateau. The feature was encountered in December 1911 by the South Pole party of the Norwegian expedition under Roald Amundsen, and was named by the Advisory Committee on Antarctic Names for Norwegian meteorologist Henrik Mohn, the author of the meteorological report of this expedition.

References

Structural basins of Antarctica
Landforms of the Ross Dependency
Amundsen Coast